The Last Adventurers is a 1937 British drama film directed by Roy Kellino and starring Niall MacGinnis, Roy Emerton, Linden Travers and Peter Gawthorne. A shipwrecked castaway is rescued by a sea captain, and then falls in love with the captain's daughter.

Cast
 Niall MacGinnis - Jeremy Bowker
 Roy Emerton - John Arkell
 Linden Travers - Ann Arkell
 Peter Gawthorne - Fergus Arkell
 Kay Walsh - Margaret Arkell
 Johnnie Schofield - Stalk
 Ballard Berkeley - Fred Devlin
 Norah Howard - Mary Allen
 Bill Shine (actor) - Joe Hanson
 Esma Cannon - Polly Shepherd
 Wallace Douglas - Red Collins

Critical reception
In the Radio Times, David Parkinson wrote, "It's a pity there's not much entertainment value to be had from this wonderful curio about a twice-shipwrecked castaway saved by a sea captain whose daughter he then falls in love with, much to the old tar's displeasure. What is fascinating about Roy Kellino's adventure is that it was edited, with greater tautness than it deserves, by director-in-waiting David Lean. The casting is also noteworthy, with future Carry On star Esma Cannon in a rare glamour role, and Ballard Berkeley (who would later achieve fame as the Major in Fawlty Towers) playing the heroic lead."

References

External links

1937 films
1937 drama films
British drama films
Films directed by Roy Kellino
Seafaring films
Films about fishing
British black-and-white films
1930s English-language films
1930s British films